In broadcasting, the watershed is the time of day after which programming with content deemed suitable only for mature or adult audiences is permitted.

In the same way that a geological watershed divides two drainage basins, a broadcasting watershed serves as a dividing line in a schedule between family-oriented content, and content deemed suitable only for a more mature audience, such as programs containing objectionable content; this can include graphic violence, strong language, and sexual intercourse, or strong references to those themes, even if they are not shown explicitly. The transition to more adult material must not be unduly abrupt and the strongest material should appear later in the evening.

In some countries, watersheds are enforced by broadcasting laws. Cultural differences around the world allow those watershed times to vary. For instance, in Australia, the watershed time is 19:30 (7:30 p.m.), and in Italy it is 22:30 (10:30 p.m.). In some countries, the schedule is divided into multiple periods with progressively fewer restrictions. In addition, some countries are more lenient towards subscription television and radio or pay-per-view channels than towards free-to-air channels.

By country

Argentina
In Argentina, any programmes broadcast between 06:00 or 07:00 and 22:00 or 22:30 must be suitable for all ages. There are also three other ratings, SAM 13, SAM 16, and SAM 18, which may be broadcast only during the broadcast time that is not covered by any programme suitable for family viewing.

Starting in September 2010, it is compulsory for broadcasters to show the notices "Comienza el horario apto para todo público" and "Finaliza el horario apto para todo público" at 6:00 a.m. or 7:00 a.m. and 10:00 p.m. or 10:30 p.m. respectively. In addition, the notice "Atención: Contenido no apto para niños, niñas y adolescentes" are shown before news broadcasts.

Australia
On Australian television, programmes are restricted to certain times based on their rating. Since December 2015, PG-rated programmes can be shown at any time of day, M-rated programmes from 19:30, and MA15+ programmes from 20:30. M-rated programmes can also be shown from 12:00 to 15:00 on school days.

Complications with Australian time zones allow that to vary slightly in some areas. For example, when daylight saving time is in effect in New South Wales, NSW-based stations broadcasting to the Gold Coast, Queensland, would effectively push the broadcast watersheds an hour earlier, as Queensland does not observe DST; however, complaints by Gold Coast residents have forced those stations to delay prime-time programming by one hour to compensate.

With the exception of subscription narrowcast channels, anything rated R18+ must not be shown on Australian television at any time, and must be edited to fit within MA15+ guidelines. Even on subscription narrowcast channels, the owner of the channel must ensure that its content is restricted to access by those with appropriate disabling devices.

Austria
There is no legally binding watershed in Austria. However, according to its regulations, the public service broadcaster's channels do not air content that might harm the physical, mental or moral development of minors before 8:15 p.m. and when fictional programmes "not suitable for children" or "only for adults" are aired an X or O, respectively, is added to the digital on-screen graphic.

Brazil
In Brazil, the concept of watershed was officially abolished on August 31, 2016, after a controversial decision made by the Supreme Federal Court (Supremo Tribunal Federal). Despite the online activism organized by some opposing parents and critics, such as Helena Martins, a journalist and representative of the National Program of Human Rights (Programa Nacional de Direitos Humanos), who created a petition on the Internet trying to prevent the decision, the Court ruled in favor of a lawsuit made by the Brazilian Labor Party (Partido Trabalhista Brasileiro), a nationally known political party who received the support (during the lawsuit) of the Brazilian Association of Radio and Television Broadcasters (Associação Brasileira de Emissoras de Rádio e Televisão), composed of a group of several radio and television broadcasters spread throughout the country. Both organizations advocated for the national abolition of the watershed, claiming that the watershed was a kind of restriction that caused problems related to the "lack of programming freedom" on the Brazilian television.

Starting in 1990, when the Advisory Rating Coordination (Coordenação de Classificação Indicativa) of the Department of Justice Politics (Departamento de Políticas de Justiça) was established, until the August 31, 2016 Supreme Court ruling, the Brazilian advisory rating system determined not only the content rating of a program, but also imposed a watershed system, who was created in line with the Child and Adolescent Statute (Estatuto da Criança e do Adolescente), a series of regulations who determine what are the children's rights in Brazil. The watershed was composed by the following rules:

 Programs rated  (Not recommended for minors under 12 - Não recomendado para menores de 12 anos) could be broadcast only between 8:00 PM (20:00) and 6:00 AM;
 Programs rated  (Not recommended for minors under 14 - Não recomendado para menores de 14 anos) could be broadcast only between 9:00 PM (21:00) and 6:00 AM;
 Programs rated  (Not recommended for minors under 16 - Não recomendado para menores de 16 anos) could be broadcast only between 10:00 PM (22:00) and 6:00 AM;
 Programs rated  (Not recommended for minors under 18 - Não recomendado para menores de 18 anos) could be broadcast only between 11:00 PM (23:00) and 6:00 AM.

The watershed was enforced only for free-to-air television channels (both VHF and UHF); pay television channels were not required to follow the watershed, and indeed, could broadcast any program anytime.

Before 1990, during the military dictatorship and in the early New Republic, the regulator entity for the watershed was the Public Diversions Censorship Division (Divisão de Censura de Diversões Públicas) of the Federal Police of Brazil (Polícia Federal do Brasil). More known simply as the "Federal Censorship" (Censura Federal), it was this division who determined if a pre-recorded television program was eligible to be transmitted on a determined time (the Censorship Division also decided what was the content rating of these programs, and had the power to impede the broadcast of unauthorized programs, meaning that all television programs that were not broadcast live had to be previously sent to the "Federal Censorship" through videotapes to receive the authorization of transmission before they could be aired).

Canada
The Code of Ethics and the Violence Code of the Canadian Association of Broadcasters (which does not include the Canadian Broadcasting Corporation and provincial public broadcasters such as TVOntario and Tele-Quebec, which are directly overseen by the CRTC) specify that broadcasters may not air programming that contains sexually explicit material or coarse or offensive language intended for adult audiences outside of the "late viewing period," which is defined as programming beginning at 9:00 p.m., and ending at 5:30 a.m. Programs that begin before 9:00 p.m. are considered pre-watershed even if they run into this time period. In regards to time zones, the watershed is based on the time zone from which the signal originates. 11:00 p.m. is the watershed for radio broadcasting; before then and after 4:00 a.m., radio stations are forbidden from broadcasting content that glorifies violence, undue coarse language, or undue sexually explicit material.

The Violence Code does provide some leniency for scheduling programs pre-watershed in order to exercise a terrestrial broadcaster's simsub rights (noting that viewers would have access to content advisories also mandated by the code). However, in any case, no broadcaster may air material that contains "gratuitous violence in any form or which sanctions, promotes or glamourizes violence."

Czech Republic
In the Czech Republic, only programmes that "can be watched by children" can be aired until 22:00. After 22:00, adult-oriented programmes may be aired. They have to be marked with star on either corner of image.

Finland
In Finland, all the major television companies (Yle, MTV Media, Nelonen Media, SBS Finland and Fox International) have agreed not to show 16-rated content before 21:00 and 18-rated content before 23:00. Television channels use their own discretion to decide the ratings. Before airing a programme, the channel must provide the related rating information to the governmental bureau Finnish Centre for Media Education and Audiovisual Media, which replaced the now-defunct Finnish Board of Film Classification in that capacity in early 2012.

France
In France, -12 rated programmes/films are not allowed before 22:00, and -16/-18 rated programmes/films are not allowed before 22:30 and 00:00
respectively. -18 rated programmes/films may air only via satellite and cable. The period in which programmes with any ratings are permitted finishes at 06:00 except for -18 programmes, which may not be issued after 05:00.

There is also one additional rating that is not used in films: -10. -10 rated programmes signifies content less intense than -12 rated programmes. All programmes and films must display the respective icon on-screen for the duration of the programme. Before December 2012, -10 rated programmes had to display the respective icon on-screen at the start and in regular intervals.

Germany
In Germany, content suitable for ages 16 and older is permitted between 22:00 and 06:00 and content suitable for adults (18 and older)
is permitted between 23:00 and 06:00. Programmes marked "Keine Jugendfreigabe" (not approved for minors) by the ratings organization FSK may thus be shown only after 23:00. Blacklisted movies may not be aired at any time. Some content rated 12 and older is permitted between 20:00 and 06:00, but there is no general watershed for such content.

If a commercial broadcaster wants to air a programme not rated by the FSK, the programme's watershed is rated by the FSF (Freiwillige Selbstkontrolle Fernsehen: Voluntary Self Regulation for TV) instead. A programme with neither rating is not usually aired by commercial broadcasters since the KJM (Kommission für Jugendmedienschutz: Commission for the Protection of Minors in the Media) may charge a fine if it finds the content inappropriate. To avoid the original watershed for a programme or to air a blacklisted movie, commercial broadcasters may ask the FSF to tell them how to cut the movie for another rating.

Greece
Greece uses a triple-tier watershed, along with a five-tier colour-coded decal scheme, displayed at the beginning and at regular intervals during all broadcasts except for news bulletins.
 A white rhombus in green indicates unrestricted programming (suitable for everybody).
 A white circle in a blue circle indicates programming that parental consent is advised and may be broadcast at any time (parental consent advised)
 A white triangle in orange indicates programming that could upset younger children and is only allowed only between 19:00 and 06:00 (suitable, parental consent required).
 A white square in purple indicates programming that may be unsuitable for children and is allowed only between 21:00 and 06:00 (suitable for minors above the age of 15).
 A white X in red indicates programming that is allowed only after midnight (suitable only for adults). Programmes with foul language and commercials with sexual oriented nudity typically fall into this category. Broadcasting content with this rating before midnight is punishable by fine except when used in the context of a suitably labelled film, theatrical play or other media.

The colour-coded ratings are mandatorily displayed and verbally announced at the beginning of each broadcast. The provisions are enforced by the National Radio and Television Council (ESR), an independent authority, whose executive members are appointed by the leaders of all parliamentary parties, preferably by unanimous consent and in extremis by an 80% supermajority.

Hungary
Hungary uses a two-tier watershed.
 Programmes rated for over 16-year-olds are allowed only between 21:00 and 05:00.
 Programmes rated for over 18-year-olds are allowed only between 22:00 and 05:00.

Hungarian television prime time ends about 23:30.

For more information about the two ratings' meaning, see .

India
India does not have a watershed. The Central Board of Film Certification (CBFC) is responsible for regulating television programming. The law permits only material rated with a U (Universal) certificate to be broadcast on television, but the law is regularly disobeyed. The government has, at times, ordered individual programmes and films to be broadcast between 11 p.m. and 5 a.m.  There have been several proposals in the past to introduce an 11 p.m. watershed, permitting programming rated 'A' (Adults Only) from then until 5 a.m., but all have been rejected by the government.

As many Indian households have only one television, nearly the entire broadcast day is positioned by broadcasters as being suitable for family viewing. Self-censorship of foreign series (particularly from the U.S.) is common in order to meet more conservative content standards, and the period between 11 p.m. and 5 a.m. is typically treated as a de facto watershed (with some channels, such as Zee Café, openly promoting programming blocks within the hours featuring "uncut" programming with fewer edits).

Ireland
In Ireland, there is no statutory requirement for a watershed. The Code of Programme Standards of the Broadcasting Authority of Ireland (BAI) requires television and radio broadcasters to use at least one of three methods to advise viewers of content, namely: an explicit watershed for adult-oriented programmes; prior warnings before potentially offensive programming; and/or a descriptive classification system. A 2005 survey for the drafters of the Code found that 83% of viewers thought a watershed was a good idea, and only 39% knew the pre-existing watershed was 21:00; 52% felt it should be 22:00 or 23:00. The 2007 Code specifies that broadcasters using a watershed must regularly promote it, and its start and end times, for viewers' awareness.

RTÉ Television implements a watershed of 21:00, as well as an onscreen classification system. Programmes with the MA ("mature audience") classification are shown only after the watershed. Programmes running through the watershed are treated as pre-watershed. RTÉ's guidelines state, "A cornerstone of our contract with television viewers is the watershed and the understanding that prior to 21.00 material broadcast should be suitable for a family audience. ... The immediately post 21.00 broadcast period should be regarded as a graduation period towards more adult material and due allowance must be made for the potential presence of children in the audience". More nuanced limits may also be applied; for example, RTÉ cleared a trailer for horror film Paranormal Activity for broadcast after 19:00, except during the Saturday evening film which many children watch. Virgin Media One operates what it calls "the internationally accepted watershed" of 21:00. Radio broadcasting does not apply a watershed.

In 2005, all television broadcasters operated a main watershed starting at 21:00. In the case of RTÉ, it ended at 06:30, while for Virgin Media One and TG4, which then had shorter broadcast hours, it ended at nighttime closedown. RTÉ Radio did not use a watershed. TG4 claimed it had "a number of different watersheds coming into effect throughout the day", while all stations had a second, less formal watershed at 22:00 for "material which is decidedly over 18". Quinn notes that the period from 18:00 to 21:00 attracts most viewer complaints, as "audience expectations of what should be shown often differ greatly".

The BAI's code regarding advertising and children states, "In general terms, programmes broadcast after 9 p.m. are not regarded as children's programmes. After this time, the primary responsibility for what a child is watching is seen to lie with the parents/guardians. The Code recognises, however, that children's viewing does not end abruptly at 9 p.m. and so the Code will offer some protection in the hour between 9 p.m. and 10 p.m."

Italy
According to Codice TV e minori (Code for Children and Television, 2002), all the channels must broadcast "general audience" programmes from 07:00 to 22:30. After 22:30, +14 programmes can be aired, while +18 programmes are prohibited from television altogether except for satellite, cable, and OTT premium adult channels.

Mexico
Department of Radio, Television and Film (Mexico) regulates television programming in Mexico. Any programmes shown on Mexican television must be classified A (suitable for all ages) for broadcast between 05:00 to 20:00. Broadcast for programmes classified as B, B-15, C and/or D can be broadcast at certain times only.

 Programmes rated B may be broadcast only from 16:00 to 05:59.
 Programmes rated B-15 may be broadcast only from 19:00 to 05:59.
 Programmes rated C may be broadcast only from 21:00 to 05:59.
 Programmes rated D can be broadcast only from 00:00 to 05:00.

The Netherlands
 
 Programmes that are rated "All ages", "6" or "9" can be broadcast all day.
 Programmes that are rated "12" can be broadcast from 20.00 to 06.00
 Programmes that are rated "16" can be broadcast from 22.00 to 06.00

The number in the age rating indicates the lowest age for which it is suitable.

New Zealand

On 1 May 2020, the new classification rating system for television (both free-to-air and subscription) was implemented.

 G and PG rated programmes can be shown at any time on both free-to-air and subscription television.
M rated programmes can be shown any time only on subscription television. On free-to-air television, M rated programmes can be shown between the hours of 9.00am and 3.00pm on weekdays (school term time only) and from 7.30pm until 5.00am on a daily basis (including weekends, school holidays and public holidays).
16 rated programmes can be shown any time only on subscription television, but must be blocked if viewers under 16 are present. On free-to-air television, 16 rated programmes can only be shown at the start of the adult-content period (8.30pm to 5.00am). 16 rated programmes may contain stronger content that may be considered unsuitable for children under the age of 16.
18 rated programmes can be shown on subscription television between 9.00am and 3.00pm on weekdays (school term time only) and from 8.00pm until 6.00am on a daily basis (including weekends, school holidays and public holidays). On free-to-air television, 18 rated programmes can be shown between 9.30pm and 5.00am. 18 rated programmes may contain more explicit but challenging content such as very frequent coarse language, very strong or graphic violence, very strong or explicit sex scenes, nudity or material that may be considered either too distressing or offensive to some adult viewers.

News and current affairs programmes and sporting events are exempt from the system altogether but still carry warnings before certain stories with graphic content or objectionable material.

Peru
Peru has adult time from 22:00 to 6:00. During the rest of the time, nevertheless, some +14 programming signs may be posted on the screen. As of 2015, there have been complaints that adult time is not enforced (either from the TV channels or the authorities) since some programs such as Combate, Esto es Guerra, Amor Amor Amor and Al fondo hay sitio have broadcast violence, or sexually suggestive material, during "unrestricted" time.

Poland
In Poland, the Czas chroniony ("Protected time") rules specify that programmes with a "12" rating or higher are not allowed to be aired during scheduling blocks intended for children, programmes with a "16" rating are not allowed to be aired before 20:00 on mainstream channels, and programmes with an "18" rating may not be aired before 23:00 on mainstream channels.

Portugal
Open channel terrestrial television stations (RTP, SIC and TVI) can broadcast programmes and films rated 16 only between 22:30 and 06:00 with a permanent visual identification and red  circle in right top on the tv screen. There are no legal restrictions on pay television, but those channels usually follow the same rules as open television, for example, the red circle on the top right  (or top left ). Pornography may be aired only on encrypted channels.

Serbia
In 2015, the Serbian broadcasting regulator, the REM (Regulatory body for Electronic Media) introduced a two-tier watershed. The watershed is based on the new TV rating system.

Programmes marked "16" are allowed to be shown only between 10 p.m. and 6 a.m. and may contain coarse language and mild references to gambling, drugs and sex.

Programmes marked "18" are allowed to be shown only between 12 a.m. and 6 a.m. and may contain extensive scenes of drugs and sex.

Slovakia
Slovak law defines a two-tier watershed and TV stations are obliged to show JSO's rating symbols through the entire program and also in promos.

Programmes given ratings of 15 or Educational 15+ can broadcast only from 8pm to 6am. Programmes given an 18 rating are permitted to be shown only from 10pm to 6am.

Slovenia
The national public broadcaster RTV Slovenija uses three watersheds. Between 8 PM and 5 AM content rated 12+ can be shown, programmes rated 15+ are allowed between 10 PM and 5 AM programmes and 18+ rated content can be screened between midnight and 5 AM. Cartoons and children's programmes have to be screened until 7 PM, when the main evening newscast begins. Many broadcasters (for example local or regional channels) also take this approach in a similar way.

A warning, which has to be shown for at least 10 seconds, has to be broadcast before airing a programme with an age restriction. It consists of showing an enlarged age rating symbol accompanied by a voiceover. The warning says: "Opozorilo! Predvajana programska vsebina vključuje prizore, ki so lahko neprimerni za mlajše otroke, zato je zanje priporočljiv ogled z vodstvom staršev ali skrbnikov ..." (The following programme contains scenes potentially inappropriate for younger children. Parental guidance is advised.) for programmes, rated VS (Vodstvo staršev - Parental guidance). Programmes, rated 12+, 15+ and 18+ are equipped with a similar kind of warning (Predvajana programska vsebina vključuje prizore, ki niso primerni za otroke do 12./15. leta starosti/otroke in mladoletnike do 18. leta starosti (The following programme contains scenes potentially inappropriate for children, younger than 12/15 / children and minors, younger than 18). Unrated programmes or programmes, meant for all audiences are exempt from the system. Examples of programmes, equipped with rating symbols include pornographic and violent content, some documentaries, newscasts, if they are shown in the timeslot, meant for children's programming and satirical shows.

The used age ratings and their respective symbols are:
 VS (vodstvo staršev): Parental guidance recommended for viewers under the age of 12. A white rhombus, containing parent and child stick figures is shown.
 12+: Not allowed under the age of 12. A white rhombus, containing the number 12 is shown.
 15+: Not allowed under the age of 15. A white rhombus, containing the number 15 is shown.
 18+: Not allowed under the age of 18. A white rhombus, containing the number 18 is shown.
 Explicit sexual content: White rhombus, containing the number 18 and one plus sign
 Pornographic content/programme with severe violence scenes: White rhombus with number 18 and two plus signs

Programmes with 18+ or 18++ icons must not be broadcast free-to-air and are allowed on scrambled pay-TV channels only.

The original content rating icons (used before 2014) were a red triangle with a stylised eye for content rated +15, while adult-only content used a red circle with a stylised eye.

Additional content type rating symbols (not shown on-screen):
 Nasilje (Violence): White rhombus, containing two stick figures; one is laying on the floor while being beaten up by the other, which is holding a baseball bat
 Strašljive vsebine (Scary content): White rhombus, containing a stylised grey ghost figure
 Spolnost (Sexuality): White rhombus, containing conjoined male and female sex symbols (circle with a cross, pointing downwards and a circle with an arrow, pointing upwards)
 Nevarno vedenje (Dangerous behaviour): White rhombus, containing a crouching stick figure, trying to jump over a fence and an open fire.
 Diskriminacija (Discrimination): White rhombus, containing three stick figures, of which the middle one is white, while the other two are black.
 Zloraba drog in/ali alkohola (Drug and/or alcohol abuse): White rhombus, containing a bottle, defaced with a stylised face.
 Neprimeren jezik (Inappropriate language use): White rhombus, containing a speech bubble with a hash sign, ampersand ("and" sign) and an exclamation mark.

The respective rating symbol has to be shown for the duration of the programme.

South Africa
South Africa takes a very hands-on approach when it comes to what children are allowed to see on television, and the parents or guardians of the child may be fined if they are caught not following the rules. The ratings used are:
 All: Suitable for all ages. The respective icon is required to be displayed on-screen for 30 seconds at the start of the programme.
 PG: Suitable for all ages, but very young children must be accompanied at all times. The respective icon is required to be displayed on-screen for one minute at the start of the programme.
 13: Prohibited to children under the age of 13. The respective icon is required to be displayed on-screen for two minutes at the start of the programme and after every commercial break.
 16: Prohibited to children under the age of 16. Programmes with this rating are not allowed before 21:00. The respective icon is required to be displayed on-screen for five minutes at the start of the programme and after every commercial break.
 18: Prohibited to children and young people under the age of 18. Programmes with this rating are not allowed before 23:00. The respective icon is required to be displayed on-screen for the duration of the programme. The content in programmes that have an "18" rating is not restricted as long as it does not have pornography, which is prohibited altogether.

Spain
In Spain, the watershed is simpler than in a lot of other countries since there is only one watershed time, but there is a quadruple-tier age rating system that is used alongside it. The ratings used in Spain are "All", "7", "12", "16" and "18". However, only 18-rated programmes are restricted. 18-rated programmes are allowed only between 22:00 and 06:00 and must broadcast a warning sound before it is shown.

Switzerland
Switzerland has no watershed. However, broadcasters are required by law to avoid any confrontation of minors with unsuitable programming through the choice of transmission time.

United Kingdom
According to Ofcom, the watershed for free-to-air television in the UK is at 21:00 (9:00 p.m.), and "material unsuitable for children" should not, in general be shown before 21:00 or after 05:30 (5:30 a.m.). For premium or pay-per-view services, the watershed is at 20:00 (8:00 p.m.). Until 1 October 2011, the period ended at 05:30 for premium channels as it still does for the free-to-air channels. On 1 October 2011, the rules for the premium channels were relaxed, with the adult-content period now ending at 06:00. Programmes that are rated 15 cannot be shown outside that period. However, some 12-rated shows can be shown before 21:00, such as The Simpsons, Malcolm in the Middle, Doctor Who, Atlantis, Only Fools and Horses and Futurama. There is no watershed on PIN-protected channels (such as Sky Cinema). On that type of channel, trying to view adult material before 20:00 requires a PIN.

In November the yearly Children in Need charity event, which is usually shown on a Friday night, has the watershed delayed until 23:30, to encourage parents to be comfortable with their children staying up after 21:00. This causes more shows to have to be censored, especially if they are part of the event. Comic Relief and Sport Relief, on the other hand, will only delay it until 22:00.

There should be a gentle transition to adult material, and 18-rated content must not air until 22:00 (10:00pm) on most channels that are without PIN protection. However, channels that are dedicated to airing adult content such as Horror Channel may be allowed to start 18-rated content at 21:00 without PIN protection.

Advertisements also have to comply with the same set of rules, and can be restricted when shown before the watershed (such as those for junk food, bingo, alcohol and condoms). Advertisements that may have an adult-related context, such as bingo, are less likely to be allowed on child-oriented channels. Some advertisements, often those for 18-rated films and video games, are not allowed before the watershed at all.

Although ratings do not have to be displayed on-screen, the channel is legally required to broadcast a verbal advisory before shows that may be unsuitable for children. Failure to do so may result in the broadcaster being given a fine. However, this rule generally does not apply to pay TV channels, so as a result, some pay TV channels, such as Comedy Central, have no verbal advisory at all.

United States
The Federal Communications Commission (FCC) has the right to regulate the broadcast of "indecent" material on free-to-air terrestrial television and radio, because it is broadcast on publicly-owned airwaves that are licensed to broadcasters. It presently enforces a 10:00 p.m. watershed, permitting adult content between then and 6:00 a.m. The FCC's jurisdiction in regards to content applies only to "over-the-air" television. Cable channels may be more permissive in their content, depending on their target audience and the standards of their advertisers, while premium channels and over-the-top streaming services are often the most permissive because they are funded primarily by their subscribers, and not commercial advertising.

In the 1975–1976 television season, the FCC attempted to enforce a "Family Viewing Hour" policy, in which the Big Three television networks (ABC, CBS, and NBC) agreed to devote the first hour of primetime to family-friendly programming. In 1976, the rule was overturned as unconstitutional following a lawsuit by the Writers Guild of America.

In 1978, the Supreme Court case FCC v. Pacifica Foundation (dealing with a broadcast of the George Carlin routine "Filthy Words" by WBAI radio) upheld the ability for the FCC to regulate the broadcast of "indecent" material on free-to-air radio and television, citing the "uniquely pervasive presence" of broadcasting in society, and the likelihood that children could be exposed to such content by chance. From then on, the FCC enforced a safe harbor on the broadcast of indecent material between 10:00 p.m. and 6:00 a.m.

In 1987, the FCC introduced a stricter definition of indecency, defined as "language or material that, in context, depicts or describes, in terms patently offensive as measured by contemporary community standards for the broadcast medium, sexual or excretory activities or organs". The FCC also removed the previous 10:00 p.m. watershed and stated that the prohibition would apply during any time that there "is a reasonable risk that children may be in the audience". In 1988, as directed by the United States Congress, the FCC announced that it would ban the broadcast of indecent material entirely, with no safe harbor. In 1991, the FCC's proposed 24 hour ban was struck down by the D.C. Circuit Court of Appeals as unconstitutional. The Telecommunications Act of 1992 re-established a safe harbor period for indecent content between midnight and 6:00 a.m. The period was lengthened back to 10:00 p.m. and 6:00 a.m. following further D.C. Circuit rulings.

Some American television scenes famous for "pushing the envelope" (such as limited nudity on NYPD Blue) were aired in the 10:00 to 11:00 p.m. hour; however, the broadcasts were before the safe harbor in the Central and Mountain time zones, where programming scheduled for 10:00 p.m. Eastern would typically be broadcast starting at 9:00 p.m. (using a one-hour delay in Mountain Time broadcast areas). Because each U.S. time zone enters safe harbor separately (at 10:00 p.m. local time), it is possible for not all network affiliates that air an "indecent" program at the same moment to face the same penalties. Such was the case with CBS, whose affiliates faced a proposed fine of US$3.63 million for a repeat of the episode "Our Sons and Daughters" of Without a Trace in December 2004. The program was flagged for depicting an orgy involving teenagers. It was televised at 10:00 p.m. in the Eastern and Pacific time zones (within the safe harbor), but at 9:00 p.m. in Central and Mountain times (outside the safe harbor). The FCC split its fine among the 111 CBS affiliates covering those time zones. After a court settlement, the network agreed to pay US$300,000 in fines.

Even though the watershed occurs at the prime time hour of 10:00 p.m., broadcast networks have since avoided indecent content to avoid reprimands from their affiliates and advertisers, and because of the constant fluctuation of indecency standards to account for changes in acceptance and FCC enforcement. In 2011 and 2012, courts overturned fines regarding a brief scene of male nudity in a 2003 NYPD Blue episode, as well as fines over fleeting expletives in a live awards show broadcast in 2002 by Fox, ruling that the FCC's basis for the fines was too vague.

Venezuela
In Venezuela, the watershed is at 23:00. The period between the watershed and 05:00 is called "Adult time" according to Article 7 of the Law on Social Responsibility on Radio, Television and Electronic Media. During that block, adult-oriented programs may be transmitted as long as they do not contain hardcore pornography, political or religious intolerance, racism or xenophobia.

By time
Here is a list of watershed times in each country, starting with the earliest and ending with the latest. For countries with a multi-tier system, the table includes only the latest watershed (for example, in Australia, MA15+ shows are not allowed until 20:30. The one for MA15+ shows would be the only one included in the table). Similarly, the table includes only the first ending time. Some countries may share the same last phase watershed time, and the conflicting boxes is then sorted by the end time.

Legend

A green box in either the start or end time means it has multiple phases of the respective event.

Notes

References

Citations

General sources

External links
 The Ofcom Broadcasting Code – Section 1
 Canadian Broadcast Standards Council – What is the Watershed?

Broadcast law
Television terminology